
The London Sketch Club is a private members' club for artists working in the field of commercial graphic art, mainly for newspapers, periodicals, and books.

History 
The club was founded in 1898 by a breakaway group of members from the Langham Sketching Club, following a disagreement over whether to have hot or cold suppers after an evening's drawing. The founder members were Dudley Hardy, Phil May, Cecil Aldin, Walter Churcher, and Tom Browne. George Charles Haité was its first president.

A joint exhibition with the Langham Sketching Club was held at the Mall Galleries in 1976.

For a while in the late 1970s, the Society of Strip Illustration held its monthly meetings at the Sketch Club.

Clubhouse 
The club relocated in 1903 from its original location to premises in Wells Street, off Oxford Street. In 1957, the club moved to 7 Dilke Street in Chelsea.

Members 

 Salomon van Abbé
 Cecil Aldin
 H. M. Bateman
 James Bateman (artist)
 Arnold Beauvais
 Tom Browne (illustrator)
 Fred Buchanan
 René Bull
 Terence Cuneo
 George Charles Haité
 Edmund Dulac
 Dudley Hardy
 John Hassall (illustrator)
 Frederick Hamilton Jackson
 David Langdon
 Alfred Leete
 Phil May (caricaturist)
 Christopher Nevinson
 George Parlby
 Bertram Prance
 James Pryde
 Charles Robinson (illustrator)
 W. Heath Robinson
 Gyrth Russell
 Lance Thackeray

See also
 List of London's gentlemen's clubs

References

Bibliography 
 
 The Pall Mall Gazette 2 April 1898

External links
 

1898 establishments in England
Gentlemen's clubs in London
British artist groups and collectives
Arts organizations established in 1898